The following is a list of mascots of Association football teams, sorted by the country in whose league they appear.

Competitions
 FIFA World Cup official mascots
 UEFA European Championship official mascots
 AFC Asian Cup official mascots
 Copa América mascots

Australia 

 Ticker – Melbourne Heart FC
 Marvin the Mariner – Central Coast Mariners FC
 Captain Yellowbeard and Admiral Frederick - Central Coast Mariners FC
 George the Gorilla – Perth Glory FC
 Spike - Perth Glory FC
 Roary the Lion – Brisbane Roar FC
 Benny – Newcastle United Jets FC
 Syd and Sydnee – Sydney FC
 Red the Kangaroo – Adelaide United FC
 Nixie - Wellington Phoenix FC

Brazil
Each Brazilian football team has a number of symbols attached to it and is used prominently by the fandom. Among these symbols are the badge, the flag, the anthem and the mascot. While the first three are commonplace all over the world, the last one is peculiarly Brazilian both in its character and its use.

A club's mascot is a cartoon character, often that of an animal, that symbolises some virtue boasted by the team. Most of them have proper names. Usually mascots come in two versions, a "soft" one, which is the official and a "hardcore" one used by ultras and torcidas, which often contain traces of vulgarity or violence.

A mascot is also created for the World Cups, and are used for promoting environmental awareness.

|-

Canada
Blue Bolt the Rabbit – FC Edmonton
Sparx the Dragon – Forge FC
Tac-Tik the dog – CF Montréal
Bitchy the Hawk – Toronto FC
Winger (former) (a bird) – Vancouver Whitecaps
Spike the Belted Kingfisher – Vancouver Whitecaps FC

Colombia

Colombian First Division League (Liga Dimayor) 
 El Águila (Eagle) Águilas Doradas Rionegro
 Barcino (Ginger Bull) Atlético Huila
 Nacho (Green Tiger) - Atlético Nacional
 Igui (Iguana) Deportivo Cali
 Odim (Gorilla) 90's - Deportivo Independiente Medellín
 Fidel (White German Shepherd) 2015- - Deportivo Independiente Medellín
 Cuy (Guinea pig) Deportivo Pasto
 Rocko (Wolf) Deportivo Pereira
 Monaguillo (Lion) - Independiente Santa Fe
 Jaguar (Jaguar) Jaguares Fútbol Club
 Willy (Shark) - Junior de Barranquilla
 Millo (Boy) Millonarios
 Blanco de la Montaña Mountain's White (Spectacled Bear) Once Caldas

Colombian Promotion Tournament (Torneo Dimayor) 
 Kike (Horse) Llaneros FC Villavicencio

England and Wales

Alice the Eagle and Pete the Eagle – Crystal Palace F.C.
Baggie Bird – West Bromwich Albion F.C.
Boiler Man – West Bromwich Albion F.C.
Barney the Owl – Sheffield Wednesday F.C.
Bartley Bluebird – Cardiff City F.C.
Beau Brummie and Belle Brummie– Birmingham City F.C.
Rover the Dog - Blackburn Rovers F.C.
Bertie Bee and Bella Bee – Burnley F.C.
Bettie Brewer – Burton Albion F.C.
Big Lupus – Chester F.C.
Billy Bantam – Bradford City A.F.C.
Billy Brewer – Burton Albion F.C.
Billy the Badger – Fulham F.C.
Bloomfield Bear - Blackpool F.C.
Bluey – Ipswich Town F.C.
Bodger - Wycombe Wanderers F.C.
Boomer the Dog – Port Vale F.C.
Boro Bear – Stevenage F.C.
Bubbles the Bear and Hammerhead – West Ham United F.C.
Buzz Bee and Buzzette – Brentford F.C.
Captain Blade – Sheffield United F.C
Captain Gas – Bristol Rovers F.C.
Camilla Canary – Norwich City F.C.
Captain Canary – Norwich City F.C.
Chaddy the Owl – Oldham Athletic A.F.C. 2002, 2003
Changy the Elephant – Everton F.C
Cherry Bear – AFC Bournemouth
Chester the Field Mouse – Chesterfield F.C.
Chirpy Cockerel – Tottenham Hotspur F.C.
Christie the Cat – Morecambe F.C.
City Gent, The – Bradford City A.F.C.
Clarence the Dragon – Northampton Town F.C.
Crusty the Pie – Wigan Athletic F.C.
Cyril and Cybil the Swans – Swansea City A.F.C.
Dazzle the Lion – Rushden & Diamonds F.C. 2001
Deepdale Duck – Preston North End F.C.
Desmond the Dragon – Rochdale A.F.C.
Digger the Dog – Dagenham & Redbridge F.C.
Donnie – MK Dons F.C.  
Donny Dog – Doncaster Rovers F.C.
Eddie the Eagle – Colchester United F.C.
Elvis J Eel – Southend United F.C.
Floyd – Charlton Athletic F.C.
Fred the Red – Manchester United F.C.
Freddy the Fox – Halifax Town A.F.C.
Gilbert the Gull – Torquay United F.C.
Grecian the Lion – Exeter City F.C.
Gresty the Lion – Crewe Alexandra FC
Gully the Seagull – Brighton and Hove Albion F.C.
Gunnersaurus Rex – Arsenal F.C.
H'Angus the Monkey – Hartlepool United F.C.
Happy Harry and Happy Hatty — Luton Town F.C.
Harry the Hornet – Watford F.C. 2000
Harvey – Charlton Athletic F.C.
Haydon the Womble – AFC Wimbledon
Hercules the Lion – Aston Villa F.C.
Herbie the Hammer – West Ham United F.C.
Jenny the Giraffe – Sutton United F.C.
Jolly Green Giant – Yeovil Town F.C.
Jude the Cat – Queens Park Rangers F.C.
Kayla the American bald eagle - Crystal Palace F.C.
KC Kat – Woking F.C.
Kingsley Royal – Reading F.C.
Lenny the Lion – Shrewsbury Town F.C.
Lofty the Lion – Bolton Wanderers F.C.
Lofty Jr. – Bolton Wanderers F.C.
Lucas the Kop Cat – Leeds United A.F.C.
Marvin the Moose – Cambridge United F.C.
Mighty Mariner – Grimsby Town F.C.
Mighty Red – Liverpool F.C. – Since 2012
Miller Bear – Rotherham United F.C.
 Mooie – MK Dons F.C.
Moonchester and Moonbeam – Manchester City F.C.
Monty Magpie and Maggie Magpie – Newcastle United F.C.
Mr Bumble – Barnet F.C.
Mr Q - Darlington F.C.
Mr Toffee – Everton F.C.
Mrs Lenny – Shrewsbury Town F.C.
Mr. and Mrs. Magpie – Notts County F.C.
Nelson - Portsmouth F.C.
Mary Rose - Portsmouth F.C.
Olga the Fox – Carlisle United F.C.
Olly the Ox and Olivia the Ox – Oxford United F.C.
Ozzie the Owl – Sheffield Wednesday F.C.
Peter Burrow – Peterborough United F.C.
Pilgrim Pete – Plymouth Argyle F.C.
Poacher the Imp – Lincoln City F.C.
Pottermus Hippo – Stoke City F.C.
Pottermiss Hippo – Stoke City F.C.
Rammie and Ewie - Derby County F.C.
Reggie Red – Crawley Town F.C.
Roary the Lion – Macclesfield Town F.C.
Roary the Lion – Middlesbrough F.C.
Roary and Amber – Hull City A.F.C.
Robbie the Bobby (Devo) – Bury F.C.
Rockin' Robin – Swindon Town F.C.
Rover the Dog - Blackburn Rovers F.C.
Rover the Dog - Tranmere Rovers F.C.
Sammy the Shrimp – Southend United F.C.
Sammy the Stag – Mansfield Town F.C.
Samson and Delilah (black cats) – Sunderland A.F.C.
Scrumpy the Robin – Bristol City
Scunny Bunny – Scunthorpe United F.C.
Robin Hood – Nottingham Forest F.C.
Sky Blue Sam – Coventry City F.C.
Spytty the Dog – Newport County A.F.C.
Stamford The Lion and Bridget The Lioness (anthropomorphic lions)  – Chelsea F.C.
Super Saint and Sammy Saint – Southampton F.C.
Swifty – Walsall F.C.
Terry Bytes – Fulham F.C.
York Sport village[YM]
Theo the Wyvern – Leyton Orient F.C.
Toby Tyke and Tabitha Tyke – Barnsley F.C.
Tommy T. Trewblu – Gillingham F.C.
Vicky Vixen – Bristol Academy W.F.C. 
Whaddney the Robin – Cheltenham Town F.C.
Filbert Fox - Leicester City F.C.
Wolfie and Wendy – Wolverhampton Wanderers F.C.
Wrex the Dragon – Wrexham F.C.
Yorkie the Lion – York City F.C.
Zampa the Lion – Millwall F.C.

Many now take part in the Mascot Grand National held each year at Kempton Park Racecourse. and at the annual Mascot Olympics held in Milton Keynes.

Germany
Al-Aix (a Colorado potato beetle) – Alemannia Aachen
Atilla (an eagle) – Eintracht Frankfurt
Berni (a bear) – FC Bayern Munich
Betzi (the devil) – 1. FC Kaiserslautern
Brian the Lion (a lion) – Bayer 04 Leverkusen
Bulli (a bull) – RB Leipzig
Bumsi (a foal with a Telstar head) – Borussia Mönchengladbach
Eddi (a dog) – Hannover 96
Eddy (a dragon) – SpVgg Greuther Fürth
Emma (a bee) – Borussia Dortmund
Ennatz (a zebra) – MSV Duisburg
Erwin (a Squire, an educated miner) – FC Schalke 04
Fiffi (an eagle) – SC Preußen Münster
Flori (an elephant) – Stuttgarter Kickers
Fritzle (an alligator) – VfB Stuttgart
Füchsle (a fox) – SC Freiburg
Grottifant (an elephant) – KFC Uerdingen 05
Hennes (a billy goat) – 1. FC Köln
Hermann (a dinosaur) – Hamburger SV
Herthinho (a bear)  – Hertha BSC
Hoffi (an elk) – TSG 1899 Hoffenheim
Holli (a mouse) – SC Paderborn 07
 Jack (a sparrow) – SSV Ulm 1846
Johannes (a clown) – 1. FSV Mainz 05
Jünter (a foal) – Borussia Mönchengladbach
Knipp-Fu Panda (a panda) – SG Wattenscheid 09
Lauzi (a knave) – FC Energie Cottbus
Li & La – VfL Osnabrück
Leo (a lion) – Eintracht Braunschweig
Lohmann (a bull) – Arminia Bielefeld
Loki (a lion) – 1. FC Lokomotive Leipzig
Paule (a bear) – 1. FC Heidenheim
Pröppi (a lion) – Wuppertaler SV
Ritter Frankie (a knight) – 1. FC Nürnberg
Ritter Keule (a knight) 1. FC Union Berlin
Schanzi (a dragon) – FC Ingolstadt 04
Sechzger (a lion) – TSV 1860 München
Stolle (a stork) – Holstein Kiel
Tore (an elk) – VfB Lübeck
Underdog (a mongrel dog) – Rot-Weiß Oberhausen
Willi Wildpark (a wild boar) – Karlsruher SC
Wölfi (a wolf) – VfL Wolfsburg

Greece 
 Panathas (a lion) - Panathinaikos F.C.
 Haga (an eagle) - AEK Athens F.C.
 Leone (a lion) - Olympiacos F.C.
Paokaras (an eagle) - Paok F.C.
Aelaras (a horse) - AEL F.C.
Mavraetos (an eagle) - Doxa Dramas F.C.
Leontokardos (a lion) - Panserraikos F.C.

Honduras
Mule – Hispano
Green Monster – Marathon
Blue Eagle – Motagua
Lion – Olimpia
Owl – Real España
Coconut Palm – Vida
Crab – Victoria
Horse – Municipal Valencia
Puma – Universidad
Shark – Platense
Cow – Atlético Olanchano
Bull – Deportes Savio

India
 Footzee – I-League
 Kesu (Elephant) – Kerala Blasters
 Baggu (Tiger) – Mohun Bagan
 Eddie The Eagle (Eagle) –  Bengaluru FC

Italy
Milanello (Devil) – A.C. Milan
Ambrogio (Biscione/Crocodile) – Inter Milan
Jay Zebra – Juventus F.C.
Donkey – S.S.C. Napoli
Olympia (Eagle) – S.S. Lazio
Romolo (Wolf) – A.S. Roma 
Wolf – U.S. Lecce, U.S. Avellino 1912
Bacciccia (Sailor) – U.C. Sampdoria
Griffon – Genoa C.F.C., A.C. Perugia Calcio
Rooster – F.C. Bari 1908
Bull – Torino F.C.
Elephant – Calcio Catania
Eagle – U.S. Palermo
Atalanta (depicted as a blonde woman wearing a blue and black kit) – Atalanta B.C.
Seahorse – U.S. Salernitana 1919, A.C. Cesena
Balanzone – Bologna F.C. 1909
Boar – Cagliari Calcio
Mastiff – Hellas Verona F.C.
Lion (Marzocco) - ACF Fiorentina
Lioness - Brescia Calcio
Anthropomorphic Leaning Tower – A.C. Pisa 1909
Bersagliere – A.C. Reggiana 1919
Dolphin – Delfino Pescara 1936 
Knight – Parma Calcio 1913, U.S. Cremonese
Flying Donkey – A.C. ChievoVerona
Devil – Foggia Calcio
Padovana chicken/Gattamelata - Calcio Padova
Winged Lion – F.B.C. Unione Venezia

Japan

J.League King – J.League
Albi-kun (Swan) – Albirex Niigata
Ardy (Squirrel) – Omiya Ardija
Avi (Wasp) – Avispa Fukuoka
Blaugon (Dragon) – Blaublitz Akita
Dio and Montes – Montedio Yamagata
Dole-kun (Blakiston's fish owl) – Hokkaido Consadole Sapporo
Fagimaru (Green pheasant) – Fagiano Okayama
Fulimaru – Yokohama FC
Fronta (Dolphin) – Kawasaki Frontale
Gainaman – Gainare Tottori
Gamba Boy – Gamba Osaka
Gamity (Ostrich) – SC Sagamihara
Gans-kun (Ptarmigan) – Matsumoto Yamaga FC
Genzo (Golden eagle) – Zweigen Kanazawa
Giffy (Milkvetch) – FC Gifu
Giran (Saunders's gull) – Giravanz Kitakyushu
Grampus-kun (Killer whale) – Nagoya Grampus
Holly-kun (Dragon) – Mito HollyHock
Jeffy (Akita dog) – JEF United Chiba
Jinbenho (Whale shark) – FC Ryukyu
Júbilo-kun (Japanese paradise flycatcher) – Júbilo Iwata
Kettobashi-kozo (Phoenix) – Fujieda MYFC
King Bell I – Shonan Bellmare
Kizuru (Paper crane) – Iwate Grulla Morioka
Laioh (Lion) – AC Nagano Parceiro
Lobby (Wolf) – Cerezo Osaka
Marinos-kun and Marinosuke (Seagull) – Yokohama F. Marinos
Movi (Kobe beef) – Vissel Kobe
Neetan (Turtle) – Oita Trinita
Orle-kun, Tamahime-chan and Iyo Kanta (Satsuma oranges) – Ehime FC
Pul-chan – Shimizu S-Pulse
Pursa-kun and Kotono-chan (Phoenix) – Kyoto Sanga FC
Raika-kun – Kataller Toyama
Redia – Urawa Red Diamonds
Renomaru (Lion) – Renofa Yamaguchi FC
Rey-kun – Kashiwa Reysol
Roasso-kun (Horse) – Roasso Kumamoto
Sancce (Asian black bear) – Sanfrecce Hiroshima
Sanupi (Udon) – Kamatamare Sanuki
Shikao (Deer) – Kashima Antlers
Tokky (Monkey) – Tochigi SC
Tokyo Dorompa (Raccoon dog) – FC Tokyo
Vanta (Japanese flying squid) – Vanraure Hachinohe
Vegatta (Eagle) – Vegalta Sendai
Vent-kun (Kai dog) – Ventforet Kofu
Verdy-kun (Andean condor) – Tokyo Verdy
Vivi-kun – V-Varen Nagasaki
Vorta-kun (Raccoon dog) – Tokushima Vortis
Wintosu (Magpie) – Sagan Tosu
Yunaiku (Satsuma dog) – Kagoshima United FC
Yuto (Lion) – Thespakusatsu Gunma
Zelvy (Kingfisher) – FC Machida Zelvia

Korea Republic
 SSID & Seoul-i (current), Cheetah (former, Anyang LG Cheetas), Bull (former, Lucky-Goldstar FC) - FC Seoul
 Aguileon – Suwon Samsung Bluewings
 Korean Dragon - Jeonnam Dragons
 Iron Boy & Iron Girl (current), Astro Boy (former, POSCO Atoms), Mega Man-like superhero (former, 1990s), Dolphin (former, POSCO Dolphins) - Pohang Steelers
 Bear - Daejeon Citizen
 Red-Crowned Crane - Incheon United
 Victo (a man of flames) - Daegu FC
 Orange - Jeju United FC
 Tiger - Ulsan Hyundai FC
 Anthropomorphic Cat and a Winged Car - Jeonbuk Hyundai Motors
 Bird - Bucheon FC 1995, 
 Baekho, the White Tiger - Korea Republic national football team

Mexico

Mexican First Division (Liga MX) 

"Kin" – Mexican Football Team
"Agüi" – América
"Lico" – Atlas
"Blu" – Cruz Azul
"Chiva Fighter", "Chiva Loca"– Guadalajara
"Balam" – Chiapas F.C.
"Garritas" - Club León
"Pachus" – Pachuca
"Camote" – Puebla
"Gallardo" White Rooster – Querétaro
"Guerrerito" – Santos Laguna
"Xolo Mayor"  – Tijuana
"Diablito" – Toluca
"Tigre de peluche" – Tigres UANL
"Monty" (bulldog) - Club de Futbol Monterrey
"Goyo" – UNAM
"Tiburcio" - Tiburones Rojos de Veracruz (Red Sharks of Veracruz)
"Super Monarca" – Club Morelia
"Toques" – Club Necaxa

Mexican First A Division (Ascenso MX) 

 "Pepe El Toro" - Club Celaya FC
 "Pepe Potro" - Atlante F.C.
 "Minero" - Mineros de Zacatecas
 "CorreFan" and "CorreKid" - Correcaminos UAT 
 Golden Fish - Dorados de Sinaloa
 "Rufian" - Leones Negros U. de G.
 "Brije" - Alebrijes de Oaxaca
 "Lobo" - Lobos B.U.A.P.

Northern Ireland
Billy Blue – Linfield F.C.

Portugal
 Águia Vitória the Eagle – S.L. Benfica
 Bessinha the Black Panther - Boavista Futebol Clube
 Draco the Dragon - FC Porto
 Jubas the Lion - Sporting Clube de Portugal
 Bracaru the Roman Soldier - Sporting Clube de Braga
 Castor - Passos de Ferreira
 Tubas the Shark - Rio Ave
 Vermelhinho the Kite - Desportivo das Aves
 Garras the Lion - Marítimo
 Tubazu the Shark - Belenenses
 Fintas the Bat - Académica Coimbra
 Billas the Fox - Feirense
 Rooster - Gil Vicente
 Bicas the Canary - Estoril Praia
 Dolphin - Vitória Futebol Clube
 Super Afonso, D. Afonso Henriques - Vitória Sport Clube

Scotland
Hoopy the huddle hound – Celtic F.C.
Baxter the Bridie – Forfar Athletic F.C.
Sammy the Scurry – Peterhead F.C.
Angus the Bull – Aberdeen F.C.
Donny the Sheep – Aberdeen F.C.
Si the Seagull – Aberdeen F.C.
Cappie the Cat – Greenock Morton F.C.
Pandamonium – Ayr United
Sammy the Tammy  – Dunfermline Athletic F.C.
Rocky the Rooster – Airdrieonians F.C.
Tynie Tigers – Heart of Midlothian F.C.
Jock the Jambo – Heart of Midlothian F.C.
Harry the Hippo – Queen's Park F.C.
Zed the Zebra – East Stirlingshire F.C.
Dougie the Doonhamer – Queen of the South F.C.
Monty Mole – Montrose F.C.
Livi Lions – Livingston F.C.
Captain Conker– Kilmarnock F.C.
Paisley Panda – St Mirren F.C.
Sunshine the Leith Lynx – Hibernian F.C.
Super Saint – St Johnstone F.C.
Terry the Terror – Dundee United F.C.
Hammy the Hamster – Hamilton Academical F.C.
Claret – Motherwell F.C.
Amber – Motherwell F.C.
InverNessie – Inverness Caledonian Thistle F.C.
RossCo the Staggie – Ross County F.C.
Pelé the Elephant – Dumbarton F.C.
Roary – Raith Rovers F.C. 
Bino Bear – Stirling Albion F.C.
Kingsley – Partick Thistle F.C.
Jaggy MacBee – Rossvale F.C. Junior team
Wally the Warrior – Stenhousemuir F.C.
DeeWok – Dundee F.C.
Eric the Eagle – East Fife F.C.
Fergus the Fox – Falkirk F.C.
Bluebell the Coo – Cowdenbeath F.C.
Broxi Bear – Rangers F.C.
Roary – Scotland national team

Slovenia
Domži - NK Domžale
Grofek - NK Celje
Ligi - NK Rudar Velenje
Petko the Eagle - NK Drava
Zmajček - NK Olimpija

Spain

 L'avi del Barça (Grandfather) - FC Barcelona
 Clam (one-eyed human figure) - FC Barcelona (former, mascot of the Centenary in 1999-00 season) 
 Indi (racoon with an Apache hat) - Atletico de Madrid
 Locco (a heart with arms and feet) - Sevilla FC
 Perico (a parakeet) - RCD Espanyol
 Palmerín (a palm) - Real Betis
 Super Rat (a bat) - Valencia CF
 Leo (a lion with crown and cape) - Real Zaragoza
 Pucelo (former, a castle merlon) - Real Valladolid (former)
 Pepe Zorrillo (a fox dressed as a knight) - Real Valladolid (current)
 Groguet (an anthropomorphic submarine) - Villarreal CF
 Bokeman (a sardine) - Malaga CF
 Datigol (a fox) - Elche CF
 Winged Bear - Getafe CF
 Zete (a bat) - Albacete Balompié
 Harrotxu (a lion) - Athletic Bilbao
 Atotxo (a superhero) - Real Sociedad (former)
 Txurdin (a football with arms, legs and a crown) - Real Sociedad
 Rojillo (a boy wearing a red and black uniform and a Txapela (the basque berret) - CA Osasuna (former)
 Gelu and Gelin (two angels) - Real Oviedo
 Granota Boja (a frog) - Levante CF
 Tula, the cow - Racing Santander
 Pica Pica, the bee - Rayo Vallecano
 Babazorro (a fox) - Deportivo Alavés
 Celestino - Celta Vigo
 El Jabato (a boar) - Mirandés CF
 Dimonio (a devil) - RCD Mallorca
 Nocho (a duck with a horned helmet) - Celta Vigo (former)
 Koki, the crocodile  - Cordoba CF
 Carmany (a figure based on Charlemagne) - Girona FC
 Pio Pio, the canary bird - UD Las Palmas
 Ferreret - CD Atlético Baleares
 Ruralito (an anthropomorphized wheat plant, based on Caja Rural's logo) - Zamora CF
 Romanito (a Roman soldier) - UD Mérida
 Pimentin (a white and red pepper) - Real Murcia (former)
 Sumi, the submarine - FC Cartagena
 Nasticus (a Roman soldier) - Gimnastic de Tarragona
 Elio-Doro, the elephant - CD Tenerife
 Roelio, the bone - Pontevedra CF
 Quillo (a man with Xerez uniform) - Xerez CD
 Pepinero, the cucumber - CD Leganés
 Eskorpius, the scorpion - Orihuela CF
 Gualdy, the wolf - Barakaldo CF
 TiVo, the bat - Alcoyano CF
 Teo Maximo (an eagle dressed as a Roman soldier) - Gimnástica Segoviana
 Akarón, the horse - Narón BP
 Rozam, the lion - UD Almería 
 Balastero, the bear - Palencia CF
 Miradin (an antromorphic scoreboard tower) - Almeria CF
 Señor Gol (a figure with a football as head and a hat) - CD Logroñés
 Yeti - Burgos FC
 Brujin, the wolf -  Sporting Gijón
Capi - LFP-Liga Profesional de Fútbol 
 Goli, the dog - LFP-Liga Profesional de Fútbol (former, lasted 1991-95 seasons)
 Estrellito, the star - LFP-Liga Profesional de Fútbol (former, 1998-99 season)
 Manolo el del Bombo - Spain National Football Team (not official)

Thailand
Shark – Chonburi F.C.
Angel – Bangkok United F.C.
Singha – TTM Phichit F.C.

Turkey
Black eagle – Beşiktaş J.K.
Canary – Fenerbahçe
Lion – Galatasaray
Crocodile – Bursaspor
Tiger and European anchovy – Trabzonspor
Rooster – Denizlispor
Double-headed eagle – Konyaspor
Seagull – Sarıyer S.K.
Hawk – Gaziantepspor

United States
Major League Soccer
Spike The Dog - Atlanta United
Sparky the Dalmatian- Chicago Fire
Talon the Eagle – D.C. United
S.C. & Crew Cat – Columbus Crew
Leo the Lion – Real Salt Lake
Tex Hooper the Bull- FC Dallas
Kingston the Lion – Orlando City
Cozmo – LA Galaxy
Rapidman – Colorado Rapids
Dynamo Diesel – Houston Dynamo
Slyde the Fox – New England Revolution
Q – San Jose Earthquakes
Timber Joey – Portland Timbers
Blue the Dog- Sporting Kansas City
PK (called "Fut Fut" by fans) – Minnesota United
Phang - Philadelphia Union
Gary the Lion - FC Cincinnati
Sammy the Sounder - Seattle Sounders
Tempo the Coyote- Nashville SC

Former (Major League Soccer)
ChivaFighter - Chivas USA
Islamico the Horse - Dallas Burn
Dynamo the Dragon - Kansas City Wizards
Twizzle - LA Galaxy
Gecko - Miami Fusion
Metro the Dog - New Jersey MetroStars
José Clash - San Jose Clash
Rikter the Cyberdog - San Jose Earthquakes
Sidekick - Tampa Bay Mutiny

National Women's Soccer League

 PK the Eagle - Washington Spirit
 Supernova - Chicago Red Stars
 Cleo the Lioness - Utah Royals FC
Diesel - Houston Dash (shared with Houston Dynamo)

Lower soccer leagues (NASL, USL, etc.)

Kickeroo – Richmond Kickers
Golazo – The Miami Football Club
Pete the Pelican – Tampa Bay Rowdies
Truckee – Reno 1868 FC

See also
FIFA World Cup mascot
UEFA European Football Championship mascot

External links
Sports Mascots
UK mascot message board

References

 
Mascots
Association football

de:Liste der Maskottchen
pt:Anexo:Lista de mascotes de futebol